The 1989–90 Scottish Cup was the 105th staging of Scotland's most prestigious football knockout competition. The Cup was won by Aberdeen who defeated Celtic in the final. It was the first final to have been decided by a penalty shootout.

First round

Replay

Second round

Replays

Third round

Replays

Fourth round

Replays

Quarter-finals

Replays

Semi-finals

Final

See also
1989–90 in Scottish football
1989–90 Scottish League Cup

Scottish Cup seasons
Scottish Cup, 1989-90
Scot